Townsend Lake is a 26-acre lake in Independence Township in Oakland County, Michigan along the main branch of the Clinton River.

Townsend Lake connects upstream to 66-acre Van Norman Lake and downstream to 135-acre Woodhull Lake.

Namesake
Townsend Lake was named for Townsend Carpenter Beardslee (b. 1832, d. 1863).  The son of John W. Beardslee (the first settler in Independence Township), Townsend was the first white child born in the township.

Fish
Fish in Townsend Lake include pumpkinseed sunfish, largemouth bass, walleye, northern pike and crappie.

References

Lakes of Oakland County, Michigan
Lakes of Michigan
Lakes of Independence Township, Michigan